The National Collegiate Athletic Association (NCAA) is divided into three divisions: Division I, Division II and Division III. The main reason for Division II and Division III schools to compete in Division I is that certain sports have either only a single division or only Divisions I and III.  As a result of this, there are some D-II and III conferences with a conference championship in a sport that has only one or two NCAA divisions (i.e., bowling, men's volleyball).

Some schools, however, have opted to compete in a sport at a higher level and are allowed to do so by the NCAA under certain circumstances. First, schools in Divisions II and III are allowed to classify one men's sport and one women's sport as Division I (except for football and basketball), provided that they were sponsoring said sports at Division I level prior to 2011. In addition to this, a lower-division school may compete as a Division I member in a given sport if the NCAA does not sponsor a championship in that sport for the school's own division. Division II schools may award scholarships and operate under Division I rules in their Division I sports. Division III schools cannot award scholarships in their Division I sports (except as noted below), but can operate under most Division I rules in those sports.

While many of the lower division schools playing with the "big schools" are frequently heavily outclassed, others not only compete successfully, but are among the elite programs in their sport (i.e., Alaska-Fairbanks in rifle, Johns Hopkins in men's lacrosse, Minnesota-Duluth in both men's and women's ice hockey).

Five Division III members are allowed to award athletic scholarships in their Division I sports—a practice otherwise not allowed for Division III schools. All of these schools sponsored a men's sport in the NCAA University Division, the predecessor to today's Division I, before the NCAA adopted its current three-division setup in 1974–75. At that time, the NCAA did not sponsor championships in women's sports. Today, these schools, sometimes called "grandfathered", are allowed to award scholarships in the one originally grandfathered sport, plus one women's sport.

Notes
Under current NCAA rules, beach volleyball and bowling are women's sports; wrestling is a men's sport; rifle is technically a men's sport, but schools can field men's, women's, and/or mixed teams; fencing and skiing are co-ed sports with teams having men's and women's squads.
Future conference affiliations indicated in this article will take effect on July 1 of the stated year. In the case of spring sports, the first year of competition will take place in the calendar year after the conference move becomes official.

Division II schools competing in Division I
The following table is a list of Division II schools competing in Division I.

Conference affiliations reflect those for the specific sports in which each school competes alongside D-I schools, and do not necessarily match their primary affiliations. Years for conference moves or the addition of sports reflect calendar years. For spring sports, this is the year before the start of competition.

Legend: Pink = Leaving division. Green = Future.

Division III schools competing in Division I
The following table is a list of Division III schools competing in Division I, including those which play in sports that have only one national championship event open to members of all NCAA divisions. Grandfathered schools, with their scholarship sports, are indicated in bold type.

Conference affiliations reflect those for the specific sports in which each school competes alongside D-I schools, and do not necessarily match their primary affiliations.

See also
 List of NCAA Division I institutions
 List of NCAA Division II institutions
 List of NCAA Division III institutions

References

Non

Schools
Schools
^
^
^
^